China Yangtze Power Co., Ltd. (CYPC), known as Yangtze Power is a Chinese utilities company, headquartered in Beijing. The company is a component of SSE 180 Index. A controlling share is held by the parent company China Three Gorges Corporation (CTG), a state-owned enterprise under State-owned Assets Supervision and Administration Commission of the State Council.

The enterprise produces and sells energy to customers. China Yangtze Power was founded on 4 November 2002 and was brought on 18 November 2003 to the Shanghai Stock Exchange. China Yangtze Power originated from a cooperation of Chinese enterprises: Huaneng Power International, China National Nuclear Corporation, China National Petroleum Corporation, Gezhouba Water Resources and Hydropower Engineering Group as well as the Changjiang Institute of Survey, Planning, Design and Research.

Three Gorges Dam Hydroelectric Plants

The Three Gorges Dam above ground hydroelectric plant became fully operational in 2010 and has an installed capacity of 18.2GW (26 x 700MW). These units have been progressively acquired from the majority owner China Three Gorges Corporation as they have been built. A final underground hydroelectric plant is expected to be transferred by 2012.

Other Hydroelectric Plants

The company is the operator of other Yangtze hydroelectric plants – Xiluodu Dam (13,860 MW), Xiangjiaba Dam (6,448 MW) and Gezhouba Dam (2,715 MW). Two other are under construction – Baihetan Dam (16,000 MW) and Wudongde Dam (10,200 MW).

Marketing

The company sells its electricity via China State Grid Corporation mainly to Central China (Hubei, Hunan, Henan, Jiangxi and Chongqing), East China (Shanghai, Jiangsu, Zhejiang and Anhui) and Guangdong Province.

References

External links

 
 

Companies listed on the Shanghai Stock Exchange
Companies in the CSI 100 Index
Electric power companies of China
Hydroelectric power companies of China
Companies based in Beijing
Energy companies established in 2002
Government-owned companies of China
Chinese companies established in 2002